
Year 453 (CDLIII) was a common year starting on Thursday (link will display the full calendar) of the Julian calendar. At the time, it was known as the Year of the Consulship of Opilio and Vincomalus (or, less frequently, year 1206 Ab urbe condita). The denomination 453 for this year has been used since the early medieval period, when the Anno Domini calendar era became the prevalent method in Europe for naming years.

Events 
 By place 

 Byzantium 
 July – Empress Pulcheria dies of natural causes at Constantinople. She has commissioned many new churches in the city during her reign. Her death leaves Flavius Aspar (magister militum) as the dominant influence on her husband, Marcian.
 Anthemius marries Marcia Euphemia, daughter of Marcian, and is elevated to the rank of comes. He is sent to the Danubian frontier to rebuild the border defences.
 The late Attila's other sons Dengizich and Ernakh, establish their kingdoms north of the Black Sea (Ukraine), supported by vassal states.

 Europe 
 Attila the Hun is found dead in bed, after a wedding feast with the Goth princess Ildica. He dies of a nosebleed at his Hungarian stronghold, drowning in his own blood at age 47 (approximate). The Huns celebrate a strava (lamentation) over his burial place with great feasting. Attila's son Ellac is appointed successor, which his brothers Dengizich and Ernakh refuse, dividing the Hunnic Empire
 Theodoric II succeeds his brother Thorismund as king of the Visigoths, Thorismund having been murdered, after violating the alliance with the Western Roman Empire.

 Asia 
 Ankō obtains the throne of his father Ingyō after the traditional order of succession and becomes the 20th emperor of Japan. His eldest brother Kinashi commits suicide, after being accused of an incestuous relationship with his sister Karu no Ōiratsume (according to the Nihon Shoki).

Births 
 Brigit of Kildare, Irish patron saint (d. 524)
 Vedast, Frankish bishop (approximate date)

Deaths 
 July – Pulcheria, Byzantine Empress
 Attila the Hun, ruler of the Hunnic Empire (b.406) 
 Helian, empress of Northern Wei
 Ingyō, emperor of Japan (approximate date)
 Kinashi, prince of Japan (approximate date)
 Liu Jun, prince of the Liu Song Dynasty (b. 429)
 Liu Shao, emperor of Liu Song (b. 426)
 Pan, concubine of Wen Di
 Thorismund, king of the Visigoths
 Wen Di, emperor of Liu Song (b. 407)
 Yin Yuying, empress of Liu Song

References